The Deutsche Tourenwagen Masters (DTM, German Touring Car Masters) is a grand touring car series sanctioned by ITR e.V. who have been affiliated to the DMSB-FIA since 1984. The series is based in Germany, with rounds elsewhere in Europe. The series currently races a modified version of Group GT3 grand touring cars, replacing the silhouette later Class 1 touring cars of earlier years.

From 2000 to 2020, the new DTM continued the former Deutsche Tourenwagen Meisterschaft (German Touring Car Championship) and ITC (International Touring Car Championship) which had been discontinued after 1996 due to high costs. The series raced prototype silhouette racing cars based on a mass-production road car in the same period.

History

The new DTM (2000)

During the ITC era, a large proportion of the revenue generated by the championship went to the FIA, which led to complaints from the teams regarding the small return on their increasingly large investment in the high-tech touring car series. Since 1997, many ideas had been discussed in order to find a compromise for the rules of a new DTM racing series. Opel put the primary emphasis on cost control, Mercedes-Benz supported expensive development in competition, BMW wanted an international series rather than one focused on Germany only, while Audi insisted on allowing their trademark quattro four-wheel drive system (despite running the rear wheel drive Audi R8 in sports car racing).

The DTM returned in 2000 as Mercedes and Opel had agreed to use cars that were based on the concept car that was shown by Opel on various occasions (e.g. the 1999 24 Hours Nürburgring where Opel celebrated its 100th anniversary). The series adopted the format of the 1995 championship, with most rounds held in Germany and occasional rounds throughout Europe, but having learnt the lessons of the ITC format, the ITR constantly made efforts to keep costs in the revived series from exploding to unreasonable levels, and to keep the championship firmly tied to its German roots. As too many races were initially planned outside Germany, no Championship (Meisterschaft) status was granted by the DMSB, and the DTM initials now stand for Deutsche Tourenwagen Masters (German Touring Car Masters).

Unlike the previous incarnation, which primarily used saloon models like the Mercedes-Benz W201, the new DTM featured only 2-door coupés. Opel used the upcoming Coupé version of the Astra as in the concept car, and Mercedes used the CLK model which was already used as the basis for the Mercedes-Benz CLK-GTR GT1-class sports car.

The motorsport arm of the Bavarian tuning company Abt Sportsline was allowed to enter on short notice. Abt used the Audi TT as a basis for a DTM car, as Audi had no suitable 2-door coupé in its model lineup at the time, even though the dimensions of the car did not fit into the rules of the series. This also meant that the 1999 STW-Supertouring-champion Christian Abt could not defend his STW title as this series was also discontinued, with Opel then moving into DTM.

DTM (2000–2003)
In May 2000, the new DTM started with the traditional Hockenheimring round on the short course. Some cars competing in the race had no or few sponsorship decals. While Opel's cars could match the speed of most Mercedes cars in the 2000 season, the hastily developed Abt-Audi ended up outclassed. As the body shape of the TT had rather poor aerodynamic properties, Abt was allowed to use a version with a stretched wheelbase and bodyshell in later years. Further dispensation was also granted, such as increased rear wing height, which helped the Abt-Audi TT-R win the DTM championship in 2002 with Laurent Aïello.

In 2002, the DTM also introduced the HANS device to increase driver safety and reduce injuries from accidents.

Ups and downs for Opel

In 2000, Manuel Reuter came second in the championship. After that year, no Opel driver was among the top three in the overall championship, with few podium finishes and no victories for the disappointing "lightnings". On the other hand, it was Opel team boss Volker Strycek who brought a new highlight to the fans, by racing a modified DTM car on the old version of the Nürburgring in 2002, 20 years after the top classes had moved to the modern Grand Prix track, and ten years after the old DTM stopped racing there. The Opels did not win in many of their race entries in the VLN endurance racing series, as they were mainly testing, but the speed was said to be impressive, and the fans loved it. However, they won the 2003 Nürburgring 24 Hours against factory efforts by Audi, who also ran a DTM-spec TT and BMW, who ran an ALMS-spec M3.

Audi joins DTM in 2004
After their successes with the Audi R8 and the official support of the Abt-TT-Rs at the Nürburgring, Audi finally joined the DTM as a factory entrant in 2004. The three constructors involved decided to switch to D-segment compact executive-based saloon bodies. The road models used as patterns since 2004 are the Audi A4, Opel Vectra GTS and the Mercedes-Benz C-Class. All dimensions, like the wheelbase, are identical in order to provide equal opportunities without the actual design of the road cars having any influence. Audi immediately had success in 2004 with Swedish driver Mattias Ekström, now a long-time veteran of the sport, becoming a DTM series champion for the first time.

DTM in 2005–2006
The championship suffered a setback in 2004 when long-time entrant Opel decided to pull out of the series at the end of the 2005 season, as part of a large cost-cutting operation in General Motors European division. Initially, the gap looked set to be filled by MG Rover, however their plans to enter the series were canceled after the company collapsed in April 2005. As a result, Audi and Mercedes ended up fielding 10 cars each in 2006, but the television deal with the major German television station ARD required three marques to participate in 2007 in order to continue the broadcast agreement.

DTM in 2007–2013
The DTM carried on with only two manufacturers in spite of the television agreement requiring three manufacturers to participate in the series. The 2007–2009 seasons were marked by the dominance of Audi. Swede Mattias Ekström won the second of his two titles in 2007, and Timo Scheider took the driver's championship in the following two years. Mercedes-Benz were in the runner-up positions in both 2008 and 2009 (Paul di Resta in 2008 and Gary Paffett in 2009). In 2010, Mercedes finally bridged the gap to Audi, as di Resta won the 2010 championship driving for AMG-Mercedes.

In 2011 and 2012, the DTM held a Race of Champions-style exhibition event in the Munich Olympic Stadium.

In 2012 BMW made a return to the series after a twenty-year absence, and won the drivers, teams, and manufacturers titles. 2012 also marked the return of three-car manufacturers since 2005 season.

Audi switched from the A4 to the A5 in 2012 and to the RS5 in 2013. In 2013, the Drag Reduction System identical to the system used in Formula 1 was introduced by ITR to improve racing in DTM.

Recent history (2014–present)
In 2014, the body shape and aerodynamic pieces of all DTM cars were modified to improve racing. The double-header races (Saturday and Sunday races) were also revived in 2015, thus switching from races with total laps run to timed races. The qualifying format was also reformatted into a single-session timed qualification (similar to the Formula One qualifying format used from 1996 to 2002), but DTM only run a single 20-minute qualifying session for Saturday and Sunday races. Performance weights were also introduced to determine the winning car's weight.

In 2017, the DTM field size was reduced from 24 to 18 cars total to improve quality as well as increasing affordability for its existing manufacturers, while making the series a more attractive proposition for any prospective entrants and manufacturers.

For the 2019 season, turbocharged engines were reintroduced to the series for the first time since 1989 (see article below for full story). Mercedes left the series following the conclusion of the 2018 season, but R-Motorsport joined the series in 2019 to run four Aston Martin-branded cars, although they would withdraw after a single season that did not yield competitive results. The 2019 season also saw the three Super GT GT500 manufacturers – Honda, Lexus and Nissan – each field a guest entry at the final race of the season, before entries from both series would compete at the non-championship Super GT x DTM Dream Race held at Fuji Speedway in Japan.

The 2021 season switched to a GT3-based regulation otherwise known as GT Plus. The Class 1 cars were replaced in order to attract more manufacturers to the series.

International expansion

DTM–Super GT unification

In March 2010, The GT Association (the governing body of the Super GT series in Japan) initially announced that the ITR were beginning to align the technical regulations with Super GT's GT500 class and NASCAR's Grand American Road Racing Association Grand Touring division to form a new Grand Touring specification. In October 2012, a cooperation agreement between DTM and Super GT was signed in Berlin. The agreement regarding the use of the 'New DTM' regulations by Japan's Super GT began in 2014 and ran for four years. DTM moved away from its previous 4.0-litre V8 specification in favour of 2.0-litre turbos in 2019, which Super GT had implemented in 2014.

NASCAR Holdings / IMSA
On 27 March 2013, the ITR and NASCAR Holdings road racing division, the International Motor Sports Association announced a North American DTM series that was scheduled to start between 2015 and 2016 based on the 2014 DTM/Class 1 regulations. As of 2019, a North American DTM series has yet to run, despite interest being shown by the North American sanctioning body to run DTM/Class 1, either as a series under IMSA sanction or possible integration into the sports car championship as a potential replacement for the GTLM/GTE class in 2022. The initial 2013 agreement to run a North American DTM Series was signed by IMSA's predecessor, Grand-Am Road Racing and did not take into account the subsequent merger of the sanctioning body with the rival sports car championship American Le Mans Series in 2014 to form United Sportscar Racing, now known as the WeatherTech Sportscar Championship.

Race format
When the DTM series returned, it used a similar format to the final season of the former DTM in 1996: two races of 100 kilometres, with a short break between them. In 2001 and 2002 there was a short race of 35 kilometres as well as a long race of 100 kilometres, which included one pit stop and points scored for the top 10 as in earlier seasons. From 2003 to 2014 there was only one race, which had a distance of about 250 kilometres, and two mandatory pit stops.

For the 2015 season a new race format was introduced. Race weekend consisted of 40-minute (Saturday) and 60-minute (Sunday) races. On Saturday's race a pit stop was optional, while on Sunday's race a pit stop was mandatory and all the four tyres had to be changed. Both races had the same scoring system.

In the 2017 season, both races of the weekend featured the same distance – 55 minutes plus a complete lap, with one race being held on Saturday, the other on Sunday. In both races, the drivers had to pit at least once for a set of fresh tyres. For the 2019 season the time limited race format was abolished and the series reverted to the fixed lap race format that was last used in 2014. However, after the opening round of the 2019 season, the series reverted the 55-minute plus one lap distance format due to issues with television broadcasts running longer than expected.

DTM drivers

The drivers have been a mixture of young and older drivers, including well known former Formula One drivers David Coulthard, Bernd Schneider, Allan McNish, Jean Alesi, Heinz-Harald Frentzen, Ralf Schumacher, JJ Lehto, Pedro Lamy, Karl Wendlinger, Emanuele Pirro, Stefano Modena, two-time F1 world champion Mika Häkkinen and former F1 2008 Canadian Grand Prix winner Robert Kubica. Others, such as Laurent Aïello, Tom Kristensen, Dindo Capello, Frank Biela, Marco Werner, Lucas Luhr, Alexandre Prémat, Yves Olivier, Jaroslav Janiš, and Alain Menu have made their career racing in sports cars and touring cars.

The DTM is also increasingly being used by young drivers such as Robert Wickens and Gary Paffett to jump-start their racing career in single-seaters. Wickens was in the 2012 Mercedes young driver program and in his first year of DTM. This strategy appears to have worked well for Christijan Albers, who built a reputation by finishing second and third in the 2003 and 2004 championships with Mercedes-Benz and then graduated to Formula One in 2005. He came back in 2008, but this time driving for Audi. After winning the championship in 2010, Paul di Resta raced from 2011 until 2013 for Mercedes-engined Formula One team Force India. He has now returned to the Mercedes DTM team. Pascal Wehrlein, who has won the championship in a Mercedes car in 2015 went on to race for Sauber F1 Team and was a test driver for the Mercedes F1 team.

Gary Paffett has also used his championship win to gain a test with McLaren, and they signed him as permanent test driver for 2006. This prevented Paffett from defending his title in 2006, however he thought that it will be a springboard for a race seat during the 2007 Formula One season. The plan failed however, and Paffett returned to DTM in 2007, but in a 2006 specification car.

Four female drivers have taken part in the championship. In 2006 Vanina Ickx started racing for Audi and Susie Stoddart-later-Wolff in 2011 for Mercedes. In 2008 Ickx was replaced by Katherine Legge, who was subsequently replaced for the 2011 season by Rahel Frey.

Cars, technology and specifications (silhouette touring car racing all eras)

Vehicle, chassis

Deutsche Tourenwagen Masters cars closely resemble public road vehicles but custom-built into a racing version as a reference of silhouette racing car format. The championship controls and specifies the chassis/car and engine manufacturers that teams are allowed to use each season. The league's choice of manufacturers are changed every year. Opel provided cars and Spiess engines in 2000–2005 with two different models (Astra in 2000–2003 later Vectra GTS V8 in 2004–2005). Opel ended its DTM program after the 2005 season, citing costs and company restructuring. Aston Martin provided the cars to R-Motorsport team in 2019, but left DTM after the 2020 season unable to secure an engine supplier.

In 2000, Mercedes-Benz AMG came to the new DTM from the 24 Hours of Le Mans. Mercedes-Benz won their first race in 1st Hockenheimring round, as well as the series title. In July 2017, Mercedes-Benz AMG company officials announced the company's withdrawal from German touring car racing after 2018 season and the immediate discontinuation of its DTM program, coinciding with its entrance into FIA Formula E Championship in 2019, and its discontinuation of its DMSB program.

During the first inaugural resumption season, all DTM car styles were utilized shorter S-segment compact sports two-door coupé-style cars until 2003 season but in 2004 coupé-style cars were minority due to the transition to four-door sedan saloon-style cars. In 2004 the four-door sedan saloon-style cars were introduced due to touring car racing's core philosophy (several touring car racing tournaments have a de facto 4-door sedan saloon cars) until 2011. For 2012 season onwards the two-door coupé-style s were returned until 2020 but the two-door coupé-style cars are much more different than 2000–2003 cars (longer length, longer wheelbase, slightly lower height and aggressive aero package as based on compact D-segment compact executive cars). The updated new coupé-style cars were introduced in 2017 thanks to new rear wing.

The cars are supposed to be fast and spectacular, while still fairly cheap to build and run. All DTM race cars have RWD and 4.0-litre V8 engines (later 2.0-litre inline-4 turbocharged engines) which are air-restricted to 460 hp but now into over 500 hp since 2017 until 2018 season and now into 610 hp including 30 hp push-to-pass since 2019 season and later 580 hp + 60 hp push-to-pass since 2020 season onwards, no matter if similar layouts or engines are available in the road cars. Instead of the road car bodies, unrelated purpose-built chassis are used, which are closer to prototype racing. Many drivers have in fact described the handling of the cars as closer to single seater racing cars than road cars. Only the roof sections of the road cars are put on top of the roll cages, and lights and other distinctive design features are used in order to provide a resemblance to the road cars. Also, in order to save money and provide close racing, many common parts from third party specialists are used, like transmission (from Hewland), brakes (from AP Racing), wheels (from ATS) and Hankook tyres (see below). The all-important aerodynamic configurations are tested in wind tunnels before the season, brought to an equal level, and kept that way throughout the season.

DTM cars adhere to a front engine rear-wheel-drive design (similar to public legal road car). A roll cage serves as a space frame chassis, covered by CFRP crash elements on the side, front and rear and covered by metallic bodywork. They have a closed cockpit, a bi-plane rear wing, and other aerodynamic parts such as front splitter, side winglets and hood holes (see also on Aerodynamics section for more details).

The price of one current DTM car is normally €600,000-€5,000,000.

Aerodynamics
All Deutsche Tourenwagen Masters cars aero packages are completely assembled. The car floor underbody is flat. Serratured side front fenders are included along with triple-decker front side winglet flicks, multiple side winglet flicks and multiple rear winglet flicks. The 2017–2018 generation of rear wing for all Deutsche Tourenwagen Masters cars are slightly wider, bi-plane wing and also parallelogram rear wing end plate. Since 2019 season onwards, the new generation of rear wings are wider than 2012–2018 generation of rear wing, single-plane wing and uniquely shaped rear wing plate. DTM cars have included a Drag Reduction System since the 2013 season (similar to Formula One) for helping the driver to overtake.

The HYLO (High Yaw Lift-Off) aerodynamic safety is integrated on the rear wing for all Deutsche Tourenwagen Masters cars started form 2020 season onwards.

Tyres

Previously Hankook and Dunlop Tyres were the tyre partner and supplier of DTM from 2000 to 2010 seasons (Dunlop) and 2011 to 2020 seasons (Hankook), carrying the SP Sport Maxx (Dunlop 2000–2010) and Ventus (Hankook 2011–2020) brands respectively. The DTM runs the bespoke compounds and same size as LMP and GT cars since 2000 and re-profiled in 2012. The current front tyre sizes are 300/680-R18 (11.8/26.8-R18) and the rear tyre sizes are 320/700-R18 (12.6/27.9-R18) (previously front tyre sizes were 240/650-R18 (9.45/25.6-R18) and the rear tyre sizes were 280/660-R18 (11.0/25.6-R18) in 2000–2003 later front tyre sizes were 265/660-R18 (10.4/25.9-R18) and the rear tyre sizes were 280/660-R18 (11.0/25.9-R18) in 2004–2010 and later front tyre sizes were 260/660-R18 (10.2/25.9-R18) and the rear tyre sizes were 280/660-R18 (11.0/25.9-R18) in 2011). The compounds of Hankook Deutsche Tourenwagen Masters tyres are currently only one dry slick compound (standard prime hard) and one wet treaded compound (full-wet only). Option tyres were used as a soft compound in 2013–2014 seasons.

Performance
According to research and pre-season stability tests, the pre-2019 model can go 0 to 100 km/h in approximately 2.6 seconds. The car had a top speed of  meaning that it is the second fastest touring car behind the Australian V8 Supercars.

A fair comparison would be both series cars using the same fuel type).

Balance of Performance
In 2015, Deutsche Tourenwagen Masters introduced a Balance of Performance (BoP) system to improve racing spectacle. The Balance of Performance (BoP) weight regulations were scrapped just before the Austrian race due to several protests and criticisms from DTM teams.

Prohibitions
Driver aids like ABS, traction control, launch control, active suspension, cockpit-adjustable anti-roll bar and partial car-to-team radio communications are currently prohibited except fuel mapping and Drag Reduction Systems, which can only be used for 12 laps in 2018 when near enough.

Driver safety
The safety is very important for all Deutsche Tourenwagen Masters drivers. Drivers are required to wear a race suit, Nomex underwear, gloves, socks, boots and headsocks in the DTM. Meanwhile, the helmets for all Deutsche Tourenwagen Masters drivers are made of carbon-fibre shell, lined with energy-absorbing foam and Nomex padding. The helmet type must meet or exceed FIA 8860-2010 certification approval as a homologation for all auto racing drivers. HANS device are required to be worn by DTM drivers since the 2002 season that meets or exceeds FIA 8858-2010 certification approval. Earpieces are also required by DTM drivers to improve communication.

Further future of Deutsche Tourenwagen Masters (GT3 Pro – 2021 and beyond)
As Super GT GT500-style "Class 1" format retired after 2020 season, the series will adopt the GT3 Pro from 2021 season onwards. The engine format of new GT3 Pro will no longer mandated instead of free (displacement, shape, number of cylinders and injectors). As a result of GT3 Pro transition, the series will no longer utilize full-factory manufacturer entrants in order to save budgets. Michelin will served as official tyre partner despite GT3 Pro transition.

The race start format will no longer have standing start with a rolling start being implemented in place.

Tyres
Michelin is now currently sole tyre partner for the series since 2021 season onwards, carrying the Pilot Sport GT S9M brand until at least one-year deal as a result of GT3-style GT Pro transition.

Scoring systems

This is the evolution of DTM points scoring system history since reborn.
2000

2001

2002

2003–2011

2012–2014

2015–present

Additionally, the top three placed drivers in qualifying also received points:

If in the case of a tie, DTM will determine the champion based on the most first-place finishes. If there is still a tie, DTM will determine the champion by the most second-place finishes, then the most third-place finishes, etc., until a champion is determined. DTM will apply the same system to other ties in the rankings at the close of the season and at any other time during the season.

Manufacturer representation

Champions

Broadcasters

DACH 
ProSiebenSat.1 Media is currently owned the domestic DTM broadcasting rights from 2018 until 2021. Qualifying and race sessions is broadcast live on ran but Sat.1 only shows the race sessions. In Switzerland, the coverage also available on MySports through UPC.

outside DACH 
Free-practices available worldwide via DTM official YouTube channel but for qualifying and race sessions only available for selected markets (including unsold) through OTT service DTM Grid.

Bold indicates highlights only

Sunday races only.

See also
 List of Deutsche Tourenwagen Masters records
 Deutsche Tourenwagen Meisterschaft (1984–1996)
 V8Star Series

References

External links

 Official website of the DTM
 Audi Sport
 AMG-Mercedes
 Opel Motorsport
 TouringCarTimes – DTM news

 
2000 establishments in Germany
Touring car racing series
Auto racing series in Germany
Recurring sporting events established in 2000
Group GT3